Hyundai Motor Brasil is the Brazilian subsidiary of the Hyundai Motor Company. Located in Piracicaba, São Paulo, HMB is the first Hyundai Motor plant in Latin America. With an investment of around R$ 1.2 billion, the plant has the capacity to produce 180,000 cars per year under three shifts. Hyundai Motor Brasil was complete in November 2012 with an investment of 7 million dollars. Over a total area of 1,390,000 m², complete vehicle production facilities for press, car body, outfitting, painting, parts/logistics warehouses, vehicle shipping areas, and other ancillary facilities were built with a total floor space of about 69,000m². 

Hyundai Brasil launched the Hyundai HB20, which started the new line of automobiles called HB, which means "Hyundai Brasil". On September 25, 2022, the cumulative sales volume of Hyundai Motor plant reached 1,758,810 units. Sales in Brazil are 1,719,868 units, with exports of 38,942 units. 



Current models

Manufactured locally 

 Hyundai HB20 (2012–present)
 Hyundai Creta (2017–present)

Assembled by Hyundai CAOA 

 Hyundai Tucson (TL) (2018–present)

Imported by Hyundai CAOA 

 Hyundai Azera

See also 
 List of Hyundai Motor Company manufacturing facilities

References

External links 
 Official website
 Hyundai Motor Brazil Video

Hyundai Motor Company
Car manufacturers of Brazil
Brazilian subsidiaries of foreign companies
Companies based in São Paulo (state)